Parmeh-ye Sofla (also Romanized as Parmeh-ye Soflá and Parmeh Sofla; also known as Parmeh-ye Pā’īn) is a village in Chenarud-e Shomali Rural District, Chenarud District, Chadegan County, Isfahan Province, Iran. At the 2006 census, its population was 481, in 100 families.

References 

Populated places in Chadegan County